Peter Sarno (born July 26, 1979) is a Canadian former professional ice hockey centre, who last played for Alleghe Hockey in the Italian Serie A.  He was selected in the sixth round of the 1997 NHL Entry Draft, 141st overall, by the Edmonton Oilers.

Playing career
As a youth, Sarno played in the 1993 Quebec International Pee-Wee Hockey Tournament with the Toronto Marlboros minor ice hockey team.

After completing a successful junior career with the Windsor Spitfires and the Sarnia Sting of the OHL, in which he twice led the league in points, Sarno apprenticed in the Oilers farm system, playing for their AHL team, the Hamilton Bulldogs.  After one season in Finland, Sarno returned to North America, where he played for the Oilers new AHL franchise, the Toronto Roadrunners.  He also made his NHL debut, playing six games with the big club.  Shortly thereafter, he was dealt to the Vancouver Canucks, who wanted more depth at their centre position.  He played one and a half seasons for their AHL affiliate, the Manitoba Moose, before signing on with the Syracuse Crunch (affiliated with the Columbus Blue Jackets).

Sarno then moved to Europe, signing with HC Fribourg-Gottéron in the Nationalliga A in Switzerland in 2006, followed by three seasons in the Deutsche Eishockey Liga in Germany, two with the Hamburg Freezers and one with Grizzly Adams Wolfsburg.  In 2010, Sarno moved to Italy and signed with the Serie A club HC Alleghe.

Transactions
February 16, 2004 - Edmonton trades Sarno to Vancouver in exchange for Tyler Moss
August 22, 2005 - Sarno signs with Columbus
May 22, 2006 - Sarno signs with HC Fribourg-Gottéron (Swiss League)

Career statistics

References

External links

1979 births
Living people
Canadian ice hockey centres
Columbus Blue Jackets players
Edmonton Oilers draft picks
Edmonton Oilers players
Espoo Blues players
Hamburg Freezers players
Hamilton Bulldogs (AHL) players
Manitoba Moose players
Sarnia Sting players
Ice hockey people from Toronto
Syracuse Crunch players
Toronto Roadrunners players
Windsor Spitfires players
Canadian expatriate ice hockey players in Finland
Canadian expatriate ice hockey players in Germany